{{taxobox
|name = Camelthorn
|image = Camel Thorn flower.JPG
|image_caption = A. maurorum flowers
|regnum = Plantae
|unranked_divisio = Angiosperms
|unranked_classis = Eudicots
|unranked_ordo = Rosids
|ordo = Fabales
|familia = Fabaceae
|genus = Alhagi
|species = A. maurorum
|binomial = Alhagi maurorum
|binomial_authority = Medik.
|synonyms = *Alhagi camelorum Fisch.
A. pseudalhagi <small>(M.Bieb.) [[Nicaise *Auguste Desvaux|Desv.]] ex B.Keller & Shap.</small>Hedysarum alhagi L.H. pseudalhagi M.Bieb.
|synonyms_ref = 
}}Alhagi maurorum is a species of legume commonly known, variously, as camelthorn, camelthorn-bush, Caspian manna, and Persian mannaplant. This shrub is native to the region extending from the Mediterranean to Russia, but has been introduced to many other areas of the world, including Australia, southern Africa, and the western United States. The perennial plant grows from a massive rhizome system which may extend over six feet into the ground. New shoots can appear over 20 feet from the parent plant. Above the ground, the plant rarely reaches four feet in height. It is a heavily branched, gray-green thicket with long spines along the branches. It bears small, bright pink to maroon pea flowers and small legume pods, which are brown or reddish and constricted between the seeds. The seeds are mottled brown beans. 

DistributionAlhagi maurorum is indigenous to temperate and tropical Eurasia and the Middle East, in: Afghanistan; Armenia; Azerbaijan; northwest China; Cyprus; northern India; Iran; Iraq; Israel; Jordan; Kazakhstan; Kuwait; Lebanon; Mongolia; Pakistan; Syria; Tajikistan; Turkey; Turkmenistan; Uzbekistan; and Russia (in Ciscaucasia, Dagestan, southern European Russia, and the southern part of the West Siberian Plain).A. maurorum has become naturalized in Australia and the southwest U.S.

UsesAlhagi maurorum has been used locally in folk medicine as a treatment for glandular tumors, nasal polyps, and ailments related to the bile ducts. It is used as a medicinal herb for its gastroprotective, diaphoretic, diuretic, expectorant, laxative, antidiarrhoeal and antiseptic properties, and in the treatment of rheumatism and hemorrhoids. The plant is mentioned in the Qur’an as a source of sweet Manna. It has also been used as a sweetener.

In the folk medicine of Iran, Alhagi maurorum decoction has been used for jaundice therapy.

EcologyAlhagi maurorum'' is a noxious weed outside its native range. It is a contaminant of alfalfa seed, and grows readily when accidentally introduced to a cultivated field. It has a wide soil tolerance, thriving on saline, sandy, rocky, and dry soils. It does best when growing next to a source of water, such as an irrigation ditch. It is unpalatable to animals and irritating when it invades forage and grazing land.

References

External links
Jepson Manual Treatment
USDA Plants Profile
invasive.org Report
Photo gallery
 Mohhammad Kazem Gharib Naseri, Seyyed Ali Mard: Gastroprotective effect of alhagi maurorum on experimental gastric ulcer in rats
 
 
 Plants of the Noble Qur’an
 Plants for a Future database: Camel Thorn

Hedysareae
Flora of Asia